Hendrik Jan Smidt  (11 October 1831, in Assen – 14 March 1917, in The Hague) was a Dutch liberal politician. He served as Minister of Justice twice, and was Governor-General of Suriname between 30 July 1885 and 18 July 1888.

See also
List of Dutch politicians

References
 

1831 births
1917 deaths
Ministers of Justice of the Netherlands
Governors of Suriname
Members of the House of Representatives (Netherlands)
People from Assen
University of Groningen alumni